Kings & Queens of the Underground is the eighth studio album by English rock vocalist Billy Idol, released on 17 October 2014 by BFI Records. It was Idol's first album of new original material since Devil's Playground (2005) and only his third album in over twenty years. The album debuted at number 34 on the Billboard 200, becoming Idol's highest-debuting album to date. The album also peaked at number 9 on the Billboard Top Rock Albums chart for the week of 8 November 2014. Videos were released for the songs "Can't Break Me Down" and "Save Me Now".

Tour
The Kings & Queens of the Underground Tour started on 5 November 2014 and ended 4 April 2015. Over the 40-date tour, Idol with his band performed in Europe, North America and Australia.

Track listing

Personnel
Billy Idol – vocals (all tracks)
Steve Stevens – lead, rhythm guitar (all tracks), acoustic guitar (tracks 1, 6 - 8, 11)
Billy Morrison – rhythm guitar (tracks 4, 9)
Trevor Horn – bass guitar (tracks 1, 4 - 11), programming (tracks 5, 7, 8), keyboards (tracks 6, 8, 11)
Ash Soan – drums (tracks 1, 4, 6 - 10), percussion (tracks 1, 8)
Matt Chamberlain – drums (track 3)
Joel M Peters – drums (track 11)
Tim Weidner – percussion (tracks 4, 9, 11), programming (track 7)
Julian Hinton – orchestral arrangement and programming (tracks 4, 6, 8, 10)
Pete Murray – orchestral arrangement and programming (track 7)
Geoff Downes – keyboards (tracks 1, 4 - 10)
Cameron Gower Poole – programming (tracks 1, 4, 9), keyboards (tracks 7, 9, 11), guitar (track 9)
Greg Kurstin – guitar (track 2), bass guitar (tracks 2, 3), keyboards (tracks 2, 3), drums (track 2), programming (track 3)
Josh Campbell – programming (tracks 1, 5), guitar (track 5), bass guitar (track 11)
Renate Sokolovska – flute (track 6)

Charts

Release history

References

External links
 

2014 albums
Billy Idol albums
Albums produced by Greg Kurstin
Albums produced by Trevor Horn